Eskista (Amharic: እስክስታ) is a traditional Ethiopian cultural dance from the  Amhara ethnic group performed by men, women, and children. It's known for its unique emphasis on intense shoulder movement which it shares with the shim-shim dance of the Tigrinya people in neighboring Eritrea. The dance is characterized by rolling and bouncing the shoulders, jilting the chest, and thrusting the neck in various directions. Eskista is typically performed to traditional Ethiopian music, but it is possible to incorporate the style of dance into modern forms of music such as the music played in modern Ethiopian music videos. The complex nature of Eskista dancing is what makes it arguably one of the most technical forms of traditional dance.

There are at least 20 regional varieties of the Eskista, all of which have their own, old, history and unique origins, although most are based on the hard life of the average farmer in the Ethiopian highlands.

References

African dances
Ethiopian culture